Red Redemption was a serious game developer based in Oxford, UK. It produced two global warming games: Climate Challenge and Fate of the World. In 2012, Red Redemption went into receivership.

Games 

Climate Challenge is a 2006 browser game produced in conjunction with the BBC, the Environmental Change Institute and the University of Oxford.  The player chooses policies to implement over a 100-year period in Europe to curb emissions, while maintaining the necessary food, water and energy supply.

Fate of the World is a 2011 game for Microsoft Windows and Mac OS with a similar theme but a global focus.  The player is put in charge of a fictional international organization managing social, technological and environmental policies.  There are several scenarios one can choose to play, with goals ranging from improving living conditions in Africa, to preventing catastrophic climate change, to exacerbating it.

See also 
Global warming game
Climate Challenge
Fate of the World

References 

Video game development companies
Defunct video game companies of the United Kingdom
Companies based in Oxford
Environmental education video games